Shanghai Suburban Railway (上海市域铁路) is a network of regional railways radiating or surrounding the city of Shanghai, China. It is a plan for the gradual implementation of a regional rail system across the metropolitan area. The system will eventually connect with Jiangsu Yangtze MIR and Hangzhou Greater Bay Area network.

Overview

Routes

Operational lines 

 Jinshan railway (Operated by China Railway Shanghai Group)
 Line 16
 Line 17

Lines under construction 

 Airport Link line (机场联络线) (construction started on June 28, 2019, opening in 2024)
 Chongming line (崇明线, part of the Shanghai Metro) (Construction started on March 29, 2021, opening in 2027)
 Jiamin line (嘉闵线) (Construction started on June 28, 2021, opening in 2027)
 Lianggang Express line (两港快线) (construction started on January 4, 2022, opening in 2025)
 Demonstration Area line (示范区线) (construction started on July 13, 2022, opening in 2028)

Planned lines

 Fengxian line (奉贤线)
 Jiaqingsongjin line (嘉青松金线)
 Nanfeng line (南枫线)
 Baojia line (宝嘉线)
 Caofeng line (曹奉线)
 East West Link line (东西联络线)
 Pudong railway (浦东铁路) (currently only freight single track non-electrified line, closed for passenger service)

On July 2, 2021, the National Development and Reform Commission issued a notice on the issuance of the "Multi-level Rail Transit Plan in the Yangtze River Delta Region". The plan proposed that by 2025, the Yangtze River Delta on the track will be basically completed. The operating mileage of arterial railways is about 17,000 kilometers, of which high-speed railways are about 8,000 kilometers, forming a three-hour inter-regional traffic circle between the Yangtze River Delta and neighboring urban agglomerations and provincial capitals. The operating mileage of intercity railways is about 1,500 kilometers, and the intercity traffic circle between neighboring big cities in the Yangtze River Delta and Shanghai, Nanjing, Hangzhou, Hefei, Ningbo and surrounding cities forms a 1-1.5 hour intercity traffic circle. The operating mileage of urban (suburban) railways is about 1,000 kilometers. The Shanghai metropolitan area and the Nanjing, Hangzhou, Hefei, and Ningbo metropolitan areas form a 0.5-1 hour commuting traffic circle.

By 2035, the Yangtze River Delta will be built on high-quality modern tracks, and the Yangtze River Delta will become a network of trunk railways, inter-city railways, urban (suburban) railways, urban rail transit facilities, zero transfers in hubs, and excellent operational service quality. Rail transit is a model area for networked, integrated, intelligent, and green development of rail transit, and rail transit comprehensively leads and promotes the development of regional integration.

References

Rail transport in Shanghai